Vanna is an unincorporated community in Hart County, in the U.S. state of Georgia.

History
A post office called Vanna was established in 1893, and remained in operation until 1988. The community was named after Vanna Ballinger, the relative of a railroad official.

The Georgia General Assembly incorporated Vanna as a town in 1912. The town's municipal charter was repealed in 1995.

References

Former municipalities in Georgia (U.S. state)
Unincorporated communities in Georgia (U.S. state)
Unincorporated communities in Hart County, Georgia
Populated places disestablished in 1995